The Politics of Denial is a book written by psychologists Michael A. Milburn and Sheree D. Conrad and published in 1996 by MIT Press. The authors argue that the political life of a nation often exhibits shared denial of painful realities, and that this phenomenon has its roots in  punitive childrearing practices which force children to deny unpleasant truths about their parents. They further argue that such strict parenting also causes authoritarian and punitive adult political positions. The book contains numerous examples from contemporary political life in the U.S, including profiles of educational, religious, and political leaders including:

 Pat Buchanan
 Newt Gingrich
 Ronald Reagan
 John Silber

See also
 Psychohistory

References

1996 non-fiction books
MIT Press books
Political books